The 1977–78 New Mexico Lobos men's basketball team represented the University of New Mexico as a member of the Western Athletic Conference during the 1977–78 NCAA Division I men's basketball season. The Lobos were coached by head coach Norm Ellenberger and played their home games at the University Arena, also known as "The Pit", in Albuquerque, New Mexico.

Roster

Schedule and results

|-
!colspan=9 style=| Regular season

|-
!colspan=9 style=| NCAA tournament

Rankings

Awards and honors
Michael Cooper  USBWA First-team All-American
Marvin Johnson  Honorable mention AP All-American

NBA draft

References

New Mexico Lobos men's basketball seasons
New Mexico
New Mexico
Lobos
Lobos